Lise Cabble (born 10 January 1958, in Amager) is a Danish singer and songwriter. Cabble has written more than ten songs for Dansk Melodi Grand Prix and Eurovision Song Contest performers. Notable songs include the 1995 Danish song Fra Mols til Skagen (co-written with Mette Mathiesen and performed by Aud Wilken) and the winner of the Eurovision Song Contest 2013, Only Teardrops (co-written with Julia Fabrin Jakobsen and Thomas Stengaard and performed by Emmelie de Forest).

From the early 1980s to the late 1990s, Cabble was the lead singer in the all female rock bands Clinic Q and then Miss B. Haven.

Selected credits
1991: "Sidste nummer" written with Mette Mathiesen, performed by Kim Larsen
1995: "Fra Mols til Skagen" written with Mette Mathiesen, performed by Aud Wilken as the Danish entry to the Eurovision Song Contest 1995 in Dublin, Ireland.
2000: "Uden dig" written with Mette Mathiesen, performed by Sanne Gottlieb
2001: "Tog Jeg Fejl" written with Mette Mathiesen, performed by Sanne Gottlieb
2008: "When Tomorrow Comes" written with Braager and Jepsen, performed by Michael Learns to Rock
2008: "Løgumkloster" performed by Marianne van Toornburg
2008: "Kortslutning" written with Jonas Krag and Boe Larsen, performed by Celina Ree
2008: "Catwoman" written with Borch, performed by Johnny Deluxe
2008: "Blue Christmas" written with Zorde and Klein, performed by Peter Frødin
2008: "Hooked on You" written with Lasse Lindorff and Mogens Binderup, performed by Lasse Lindorff
2009: "Big Bang Baby" written with duo Nordstrøm, performed by Claus Christensen
2009: "Det' det" written with Mogens Binderup and Lasse Lindorff, performed by Sukkerchok
2009: "Taxa" written with Zorde and Mogens Binderup, performed by Sanne Salomonsen
2009: "Hel igen" written with Krag and Mogens Binderup, performed by Sanne Salomonsen
2009: "Kun dig" written with Rune Braager and MariaMatilde Band, performed by MariaMatilde Band
2009: "Rocket" written with Halvor Jensen and Fält, performed by Mohamed Ali
2010: "Kæmper for kærlighed" written with Lasse Lindorff and Martin Michael Larsson, performed by Sukkerchok
2010: "Come Come Run Away" written with Munk, performed by Silas & Kat
2011: "New Tomorrow" written with Jakob Glæsner, performed by A Friend In London as the Danish entry to the Eurovision Song Contest 2011 in Düsseldorf, Germany.
2012: "Universe" written with Simon Borch and Boe Larsen, performed by Karen Viuff
2013: "Only Teardrops" written with Julia Fabrin Jakobsen and Thomas Stengaard, performed by Emmelie de Forest as the Danish entry to the Eurovision Song Contest 2013 in Malmö, Sweden, which it won.
2015: "Tæt på mine drømme" written with Maria Danielle Andersen and Jacob Glæsner, performed by Julie Bjerre in Dansk Melodi Grand Prix 2015
2018: "Starlight" performed by Anna Ritsmar in Dansk Melodi Grand Prix 2018
2019: "Love Is Forever" written with Melanie Wehbe and Emil Lei, performed by Leonora as the Danish entry to the Eurovision Song Contest 2019 in Tel Aviv, Israel.
2021: "Silver Bullet" written with Gisli Gislason, Rasmus Soeegren and August Emil, performed by The Cosmic Twins in Dansk Melodi Grand Prix 2021.

References

External links

Danish songwriters
Living people
1958 births
Eurovision Song Contest winners